The Mayor of Gramado is the Head of Government of the town. The mayor is elected for a four-year term, allowed to seek re-election only once. The current Mayor is Nestor Tissot.

Gramado has a weak mayor-council form of government and, all executive powers are vested in the person of the mayor. Gramado Town Charter sets these responsibilities (Chapter III, Section II, Article 60), among others, for the Mayor of Gramado:
Being the legal representatives in all lawsuits whenever Gramado is either plaintiff or defendant
Appointment and firing of Cabinet members, their deputies, and every person appointed to a body connected to Town Hall
Sponsoring bills as set forth by Town Charter
Sign into law bills approved by Town Council
Veto bills, either totally or partially
Setting up bureaucracy
Issuance of condemnation ordinances
Drafting of appropriation bills

List of mayors since Emancipation

Notes
Casagrande, Gilnei. "Avenida Borges de Medeiros." gramadosite.com. 31 January 2006. 15 September 2006 . 
Gramado Town Charter. 

Gramado, Rio Grande do Sul (Brazil)
Rio Grande do Sul